Christina Kirk in New York, New York, is an American actress.

Career 
Kirk appeared in Woody Allen's Melinda and Melinda and Ira Sachs' Love Is Strange. She also was in Clybourne Park, a play by Bruce Norris. She was also a series regular on A to Z, and most recently played Jackie in the DC Comics TV series Powerless.

Filmography

Films 
 1998 Safe Men - Hannah.
 2002 Bug (2002 film) - Olive.
 2004 Melinda and Melinda - Jennifer.
 2014 Love Is Strange - Mindy.

Personal life 
Kirk was married to John Hamburg who is a screenwriter on September 24, 2005.

References

External links 
 Christina Kirk at allmovie.com
 

Living people
Actresses from New York City
American film actresses
American stage actresses
American television actresses
20th-century American actresses
21st-century American actresses
Year of birth missing (living people)